The Usa Marine Biological Institute (UMBI) (sometimes referred to as MBI-Japan, Japanese Marine Biological Institute,  Usa Kaiyo Center or just Usa) is one of the oldest and largest centers for phycology, marine biology research, graduate training, and public service in Japan. It is devoted to scientific research  leading to MS and PhD degrees in phycology, marine biology and related fields. It grants degrees jointly with Kochi University.

UMBI is located in the village of Usa cho, Kōchi Prefecture, Japan.

History
The Usa Marine Biological Station was founded in 1953 as an independent research institute by the Japanese Government. In 1978, its name was changed to Usa Marine Biological Institute. 

Under the directorship of Professor Masao Ohno, the institute established a Japan International Cooperation Agency (JICA) training program in marine biology, since when a large number of foreign researchers have come to the institute to pursue short-term research projects. The current director, Professor Izumi Kinoshita, supervises and coordinates the JICA training program.

In 2004, UMBI started a new graduate program, Kuroshio Sciences, jointly with Kochi University, to study the Kuroshio Current from an interdisciplinary perspective.

UMBI graduate students are supported by various financial aid schemes, especially the Monbukagakusho MEXT International PhD Program.

Vessels

UMBI operates several manned research vessels and vehicles, owned by Kochi University or the Japanese Government
 R/V Yutaka Hata Maru
 R/V Neptune
 R/V Hamayu
 R/V Triton

Laboratories

Early life-history of fishes
Zooplankton Ecology
Crustacean Ecology
Marine Phycology

Phycological research

Usa Marine Biological Institute is renowned for marine phycological research. Emeritus Professor Masao Ohno was the first person in Japan to use an artificial seeding method for the commercial cultivation of green algae. The institute is one of the pioneer research institutes in the world for the study of Ulvophycean algae and has state-of-art facilities for marine phycological research.

Contemporary marine phycology research in the UMBI focuses on culture studies to establish life-histories of Ulvophycean algae (Ulva and Monostroma), tank cultivation of Ulva using deep seawater (conducted jointly with the Deep Seawater Research Center, Muroto, Japan) and the ecology of Ecklonia and Sargasm species in the Pacific Ocean.

Notable alumni
Masao Ohno
Professor Nakauchi
Professor Yamaoka

See also 
 The Scripps Institution of Oceanography is a similar research facility located in La Jolla, California.
 The Woods Hole Oceanographic Institution is a similar oceanographic facility located at Woods Hole in Massachusetts.
 The Institute of Algological Research is a similar phycological research institute also located in Japan
 The Friday Harbor Laboratories in the United States conducts similar research in marine biology.

External links
Usa Marine Biological Institute

Oceanographic organizations
Marine biology
Japan International Cooperation Agency
India–Japan relations